Frederick George Rees Cuming  (February 16, 1930 – 12 June, 2022), normally known as Fred Cuming, was a contemporary British landscape painter, who worked in a traditional manner.

Life and art
Cuming was born in London of English, Scottish and Irish ancestry. He received his art education at Sidcup School of Art (1945–9) and, after National Service, at the Royal College of Art. He was awarded the Abbey Minor Travelling Scholarship to visit Italy. In 1969, he was elected an Associate of the Royal Academy (ARA), and a Royal Academician (RA) in 1974. He was elected as a member of the New English Art Club in 1960.

As well as continuing to paint Italian scenes, including Venice, he still devoted much time to the landscape of the Southern English coastline, including Hastings and Rye. His art has an impressionist quality which captures "the fleeting impressions of his surroundings". He first encountered such landscapes as a child evacuee during the Blitz. The powerful contrast to his home in London created an enduring love for it.

He lived in Rye, near Ashford, Kent until his death in June 2022.
 

In a review for the BBC, Andrew Walker said:

Awards
His awards included:
1977 Joint winner of Grand Prix Fine Art, Monte Carlo
1986 Sir Brinsley Ford Award, New English Club
1988 Grand Prix de l'Art Contemporaries
1994 House and Garden Award

Collections
His work is in many collections including the Royal Academy, Ministry of Works, Maidstone Museum, Carlisle Museum,  Worcester College, Oxford, London Tourist Board, National Trust Foundation for Art, Department of the Environment, Brighton and Hove Museum, National Museum of Wales, Cardiff, Bradford Museum, New Metropole Arts Centre, Folkestone, Monte Carlo Museum, St John's College, Oxford, Lloyd's of London, London Weekend Television and the Guinness Collection.

See also
Federation of British Artists

Notes and references

External links
 
 
 

1930 births
2022 deaths
Royal Academicians
20th-century British painters
British male painters
21st-century British painters
Alumni of the Royal College of Art
British landscape painters
20th-century British male artists
21st-century British male artists
Artists from London